Gustavus John Esselen (1888–1952) was an American chemist born in Roxbury, Boston,             Massachusetts. He studied at Harvard University where he was awarded the A.B. (magna cum laude) in chemistry in 1909 and a doctorate in 1912. Until 1921 he was a member of the research staff of General Electric and then of Arthur D. Little. There with Little and Wallace Murray he contrived to make a 'silk' purse from reconstituted collagen extracted from a sow's      ear.  In 1930 he founded  Gustavus J. Esselen, Inc., which following a merger, became Esselen Research Division of United States Testing  Co., Inc. Among the successful projects for industrial clients he was involved with was the  development of anhydride  curing agents for epoxy resins and polyvinyl butyral as an improved material for the subsequent commercialization of laminated glass for use in vehicles etc. More  than 40 U.S. patents were issued as a result of his research efforts. He was a member of the American Chemical Society for 43 years, twice chairman of the Northeastern Section (1922–23)  and served as councilor and director of the national organization. From 1919 to 1951  he was chairman of the American Section of the Society of Chemical Industry. Prior to World War II he was a reserve officer in the U.S. Army's Chemical Warfare Service. During the war he was a committee chairman with the Office of Scientific Research and Development.

Esselen Award 
In 1987, the Esselen Award was established in his honor.
The Esselen Award for Chemistry in the public interest is one of the most prestigious honors provided by the Northeastern Section of the ACS. The award of  $5,000 annually recognizes a chemist whose scientific and technical work has contributed to the public well-being, and has thereby communicated positive values of the chemical profession. Notable recipients include F. Sherwood Rowland, Mario Molina, Bruce Ames, Kyriacos C. Nicolaou, Robert S. Langer, Joseph M. DeSimone, Jean Fréchet, Ronald Breslow and Bruce Roth. The 2011 winner was  Arthur J. Nozik.

References

1888 births
1952 deaths
20th-century American chemists
Harvard College alumni
People from Boston
Harvard Graduate School of Arts and Sciences alumni